Calliostoma leptophyma is a species of sea snail, a marine gastropod mollusk in the family Calliostomatidae.

Description

Distribution
This marine species occurs at bathyal depth off the Azores, North Africa and the Western Sahara

References

 Gofas, S.; Le Renard, J.; Bouchet, P. (2001). Mollusca, in: Costello, M.J. et al. (Ed.) (2001). European register of marine species: a check-list of the marine species in Europe and a bibliography of guides to their identification. Collection Patrimoines Naturels, 50: pp. 180–213

External links
 Dautzenberg P. & Fischer H. (1896). Dragages effectués par l'Hirondelle et par la Princesse Alice 1888-1895. 1. Mollusques Gastéropodes. Mémoires de la Société Zoologique de France. 9: 395-498, pl. 15-22
 Locard A. (1897-1898). Expéditions scientifiques du Travailleur et du Talisman pendant les années 1880, 1881, 1882 et 1883. Mollusques testacés. Paris, Masson. vol. 1 [1897], p. 1-516 pl. 1-22; vol. 2 [1898], p. 1-515, pl. 1-18
 Gofas, S.; Luque, Á. A.; Templado, J.; Salas, C. (2017). A national checklist of marine Mollusca in Spanish waters. Scientia Marina. 81(2) : 241-254, and supplementary online material
 Hoffman, L.; Beuck, L.; Van Heugten, B.; Lavaleye, M.; Freiwald, A. (2019). Last snails standing since the Early Pleistocene, a tale of Calliostomatidae (Gastropoda) living in deep-water coral habitats in the north-eastern Atlantic. Zootaxa. 4613(1): 93-110
 Rolán E.; Suárez M. (2007). Primera cita de Calliostoma leptophyma (Mollusca, Calliostomatidae) para aguas de la Península Ibérica. Noticiario de la Sociedad Española de Malacología. 47: 39-43
  Serge GOFAS, Ángel A. LUQUE, Joan Daniel OLIVER,José TEMPLADO & Alberto SERRA (2021) - The Mollusca of Galicia Bank (NE Atlantic Ocean); European Journal of Taxonomy 785: 1–114

leptophyma
Gastropods described in 1896